Astro Bot Rescue Mission is a 2018 platform video game developed by Japan Studio's Team Asobi division and published by Sony Interactive Entertainment for PlayStation 4's  PlayStation VR headset. It stars a cast of robot characters first introduced in The Playroom, where they appeared as robots that lived inside of the DualShock 4 controller. In the game, the player teams up with Captain Astro and goes on a quest to rescue his lost crew scattered across different worlds. The game received positive reviews from critics, who praised the game's use of the DualShock 4 and its varied level design.

Gameplay
Astro Bot Rescue Mission is a 3D platform game in which the player takes control of Astro Bot, a small robot using the DualShock 4. Astro is able to jump, hover, punch and charge his punch into a spinning attack. The game is in VR; one of the particularities is that the camera is controlled by the player's head's movements rather than the right analog stick. As the VR player, they also exist in this world as a giant robot following Astro, with the ability to interact with the environment; for instance by destroying walls with head-butts, dodging enemies attack or blowing in the headset's microphone to spread flower petals. 

The goal of the game is to rescue Astro's crew scattered around each world. The game has five worlds and twenty levels, with a total of 213 bots to rescue. There are 8 lost robots in each level and finding them requires skillful jumping and looking carefully through the environment. The game utilizes 3D audio so the player can locate the voice of Bots. At the end of every world, a boss waits and requires a certain number of bots rescued to unlock, occasionally prompting the user to return to previously cleared levels in order to rescue more of the lost bots. Just like Bots, Space Chameleons are hidden per level, and the player can find them by relying on 3D audio. When a Space Chameleon is found, a special extra challenge stage is unlocked, doubling the game content. In some levels, Magic Chests can be found that contains controller gadgets. There are 7 gadgets in total (Hook shot, Water Gun, Shuriken, Tight Rope, Magic Light, Machine Gun and Slingshot). The water gun, for instance lets you grow plants to make platforms for Astro to jump on, activate turbines or cool down lava to create a safe path for Astro Bot. Using these controller gadgets, you are able to help Astro through his journey, combining the 3rd person platforming with the gadget use in 1st Person. This duality is one of Astro Bot's unique points and makes it a mix between traditional platform games and VR positional gameplay. At the end of every world, a huge boss awaits requiring you and Astro to work as a team to defeat.

Development
The game was created by Japan Studio's Team Asobi division. Due to popular demand and fan feedback of the mini game called "Robot Rescue" in The Playroom VR, Japan Studio decided to make a fully fleshed game based on the mini game. Astro Bot Rescue Mission was developed in 18 months by a team of 25 people. The music was composed by Kenneth C M Young. The game has been bundled with fellow VR game Moss.

Reception

The game was released on 2 October 2018 in Europe and North America and 3 October 2018 in Asia in both digital and boxed formats. As of July 2019, Astro Bot Rescue Mission is the highest rated VR game in history according to review site Metacritic, and the 6th highest rated PS4 game in 2018. The game was especially praised for its use of the DualShock 4 controller's features and varied level design.

Chris Dunlap's 10/10 score on GamingAge stated that "Astro Bot Rescue Mission is an extremely fun and engaging game, and a dynamite addition to the growing PSVR library." PSU.com said "Easily the best platformer and PS VR game on the market this year."

Accolades

Sequel

A sequel, Astro's Playroom, was released for the PlayStation 5 as a launch title that is pre-installed on every console and served as a tech demo for the new DualSense controller.

References

External links
Official website

2018 video games
3D platform games
PlayStation Network games
PlayStation VR games
PlayStation 4 games
PlayStation 4-only games
PlayStation 4 Pro enhanced games
Sony Interactive Entertainment games
Single-player video games
Sony Interactive Entertainment franchises
Astro Bot
Video games developed in Japan
Video games about robots
Video games scored by Kenneth Young
The Game Awards winners